The 2017 FIBA 3x3 World Tour Lausanne Masters was a 3x3 basketball tournament held in Lausanne, Switzerland at a temporary venue constructed next to the stone arches of the imposing bridge known as Le Grand Pont from August 25–26, 2017. This was the fourth stop on the 2017 FIBA 3x3 World Tour.

Participants
12 teams qualified to participate at the Lausanne Masters.

Preliminary round

Pool A

|}

Pool B

|}

Pool C

|}

Pool D

|}

Final Round

Final standings

References

External links
Lausanne Masters Official Website

2017 FIBA 3x3 World Tour
International basketball competitions hosted by Switzerland
2017 in Swiss sport
Sport in Lausanne